Hornby is a surname. Notable people with the surname include:

A. N. Hornby (1847–1925), English rugby and cricket player
A. S. Hornby (1898–1978), English grammarian, lexicographer, and pioneer in the field of English language learning and teaching (ELT)
Andy Hornby (born 1967), English businessman
Anna Hornby (1914–1996), English painter and calligrapher
Ben Hornby (born 1980), Australian rugby league player
Clive Hornby (1944–2008), English actor
D. Brock Hornby (born 1944), American judge
Edmund Hornby (politician) (1773–1857), British politician
Edmund Grimani Hornby (1825–1896), British judge
Edmund Phipps-Hornby (1857–1947), English recipient of the Victoria Cross
Edward Kenworthy Hornby (1839–1887), British politician
Frank Hornby (1863–1936), English inventor of Meccano and Hornby Trains
Geoffrey Thomas Phipps Hornby (1825–1895), British admiral of the fleet
Hugh Leycester Hornby (1888–1965), Anglican clergyman
James John Hornby (1826–1909), headmaster and, later, provost of Eton
John Hornby (1880–1927), Canadian explorer
Judy Hornby, British-American fashion designer 
Lesley Hornby (born 1949), birth name of English model, actress, and singer better known as "Twiggy"
Nick Hornby (born 1957), author
Nick Hornby (artist) (born 1980), British artist
Phil Hornby, British news reporter
Phipps Hornby (1785–1867), British naval officer
Phipps Hornby (cricketer) (1820–1848), English cricketer
Richard Hornby (1922–2007), British politician and businessman
Robert William Bilton Hornby (1821–1888), priest, antiquarian and lord of the manor from the City of York
Ron Hornby (1914–1962), British football player
Ross Hornby, Canadian diplomat
Simon Hornby (1934–2010), English businessman
Warwick Hornby, Australian musician in the band The Whitlams
Wilfrid Bird Hornby (born 1851), Anglican bishop
William Hornby (governor) (c.1723–1803), Governor of Bombay
Sir William Hornby, 1st Baronet (1841–1928), English industrialist and politician, son of William Henry
William Henry Hornby (1805–1884), English industrialist and politician

See also
 Hornsby (surname)
 Hornby baronets

English toponymic surnames